Ha (hiragana: は, katakana: ハ) is one of the Japanese kana, each of which represent one mora. Both represent . They are also used as a grammatical particle (in such cases, they denote , including in the greeting "kon'nichiwa") and serve as the topic marker of the sentence. は originates from 波 and ハ from 八.

In the Sakhalin dialect of the Ainu language, the katakana ハ can be written as small ㇵ to represent a final h sound after an a sound (アㇵ ah).  This, along with other extended katakana, was developed by Japanese linguists to represent sounds in Ainu not present in standard Japanese katakana.

When used as a particle, は is pronounced as わ [wa]. は is also pronounced as わ in some words (e.g. もののあはれ pronounced as mono no aware).

Stroke order

The Hiragana は is made with three strokes:
A vertical line on the left side with a small curve.
A horizontal stroke near the center.
A vertical stroke on the right at the center of the second stroke followed by a loop near the end.

The Katakana ハ is made with two strokes:
A straight stroke from the top pointing towards the bottom left.
Another straight stroke going the opposite way, i.e. from the top to the bottom right

The hiragana は is read as "wa" when it represents a particle.

Other communicative representations

 Full Braille representation

 Computer encodings

See also
 Japanese grammar

References

Specific kana